Ronald Guimarães Levinsohn (October 9, 1935 in Rio Grande do Sul - January 27, 2020 in Rio de Janeiro) was a Brazilian businessman who was the proprietor of the Delfin Group, and was involved in a multibillion-dollar corruption and embezzlement scandal in connection to the National Housing Bank of Brazil in the 1980s.

References

1935 births
2020 deaths
Brazilian businesspeople
Brazilian criminals
People from Rio Grande do Sul